The Flemish Union of Students (VVS) is an organisation that represents the students of Flanders, the Dutch-speaking part of Belgium.

VVS can only represent the students in the Flemish community of Belgium due to the historically grown federalisation of the country. For the French Community of Belgium there is a separate student union (FEF). VVS is a member of the European Students' Union.

See also
 Education in Flanders
 Education in Belgium

External links
 

Student organisations in Belgium